As a surname, Huck may refer to:

 Anton Huck (1881–1951), Canadian merchant and politician
 Bill Huck (born 1954), German cyclist, world sprint champion in 1989 and 1990
 Fran Huck (born 1945), Canadian retired hockey player
 Jean-Noël Huck (born 1948), French retired football player and manager
 Karsten Huck (born 1945), German equestrian and Olympic medalist
 Lloyd Huck (1922–2012), American business executive and philanthropist
 Luciano Huck (born 1971), Brazilian television personality
 Marco Huck (born 1984), German boxer currently holder of the WBO Cruiserweight title
 Paul Huck (born 1940), American lawyer and judge
 Richard Huck, US Marine Corps major general
 Violette Huck (born 1988), French tennis player
 Willie Huck (born 1979), French footballer, son of Jean-Noël Huck
 Winnifred Sprague Mason Huck (1882–1936), journalist and U.S. Congresswoman

See also 

Huq, surname